The Youth Innovation Fund is a national program that seeds youth activism, service learning, youth-led media through civic engagement programs in eight cities across the United States. Based in Washington, D.C., the Fund operates in Ypsilanti, Michigan, San Francisco, California, Portland, Oregon, Portland, Maine, Nashville, Tennessee, Hampton, Virginia, Cleveland, Mississippi and Chicago, Illinois. It is funded by the W. K. Kellogg Foundation and supported by the National Service-Learning Partnership.

History
In 2003 the Youth Innovation Fund was funded by the W. K. Kellogg Foundation to help the National Service-Learning Partnership, at the Academy for Educational Development, establish a new development source for "youth-directed civic action". The Youth Innovation Fund's primary purpose is to support youth, working in partnership with community institutions, and to create innovations that address public issues and problems using a service learning framework.

Eight sites were chosen nationwide to receive grants in Chicago, Cleveland, Mississippi, Hampton, Virginia, Nashville, Portland, Maine, Portland, Oregon, San Francisco and Ypsilanti, Michigan. These boards were to consist of diverse youth ages 12-19 that represented the wide variety of races and socio-economic backgrounds of the youth population at the site. Each youth board makes strategic mini-grants to youth-directed civic action projects that utilize a service-learning framework. The youth boards also develop impact plans to create the structures and policies to sustain systemic youth engagement in a city and/or school district.

References

External links
 Youth Innovation Fund website.
 San Francisco Youth Innovation Fund website.
 Portland/Multnomah County Youth Innovation Fund website.
 Nashville Youth Innovation Fund website.
 Hampton, Virginia Youth Innovation Fund website.

Alternative education 
Youth organizations based in Washington, D.C.
Non-profit organizations based in Washington, D.C.
Youth empowerment organizations